Overcomer is the fifth studio album by contemporary Christian music singer Mandisa. The album was released on August 27, 2013, on Sparrow Records. The album has achieved commercial charting successes, as well as critical acclaim by music critics.  It also won a Grammy Award in the category of Best Contemporary Christian Music Album.

Critical reception 

Overcomer garnered critical acclaim from the six music critics to critique the album. At Worship Leader, Randy Cross evoked that "This is without a doubt the most positive and reassuring album of the year!" Kim Jones of About.com implored that with "Those major writing talents combined with her stellar voice equal a fantastic project" because of this "Mandisa has done it again and we all win." At CCM Magazine, Grace S. Aspinwall called this "an encouraging and hopeful project." Tony Coupe of Cross Rhythms felt that "The whole of this quality album comes across as autobiographical and if you are looking for an album to encourage, this will do nicely." Bert Gangl of Jesus Freak Hideout wrote that the release has an "infectiously positive vibe, rock-solid melodic content and contagiously enthusiastic delivery by a singer whose voice, on her worst day, could probably still shatter the average Waterford crystal centerpiece, any such word-related deficits become largely imperceptible and, truth be told, seem positively irrelevant in the grand scheme of a work this appealing." At New Release Tuesday, Kevin Davis noted this release comes "loaded with positive grace-filled messages of hope from someone who has struggled with the pressures of life and understands that true happiness and empowerment only comes from her relationship with God.", and stated that the music will cause people to "dance and sing along". Jonathan Andre of Indie Vision Music told that this was "Well done", and called this "a poignant and treasured album". At Christian Music Zine, Joshua Andre wrote that "Overcomer is stacked with inspirational tune after inspirational tune." Andrew Funderburk of CM Addict told that "While not like previous albums artistically, at points the album doesn't feel as if it's been taken to the next level", however he called the effort "upbeat, energized, yet fuels a message of hope to those who are down." At The Phantom Tollbooth, Michael Dalton felt that "Maturity does not come easily.", and noted that "Overcomer is like a roadmap to follow." Jono Davies of Louder Than the Music affirmed that "She has produced yet another album of quality pop music for the listener to really get their teeth into."

Commercial performance
For the Billboard charting week of September 14, 2013, Overcomer was the No. 29 album sold in all of the United States via the Billboard 200, and it was the No. 1 Top Christian Album as well with over 12,000 copies sold in its first week.  The album has sold 140,000 copies in the US as of July 2014.

The title track "Overcomer" was No.1 on the National Christian Audience chart for 12 weeks, as well as No. 1 for 14 weeks on SoundScan's Christian/Gospel Core Digital sales chart.

Awards
Overcomer won Best Contemporary Christian Music Album in the 2014 Grammy Awards. The title song from the album also won Best Contemporary Christian Music Song for songwriters David Garcia, Ben Glover and Christopher Stevens.

Singles

"Overcomer" was released as the first single from the album on June 21, 2013.

"Back To You" was released as the second single on March 17, 2014.

"Press On" was released as the third single from the album on February 16, 2015.

Track listing

Charts

Weekly charts

Year-end charts

References

2013 albums
Mandisa albums
Sparrow Records albums